Life Inside Out is a 2013 American independent film directed by Jill D'Agnenica, written by Maggie Baird and Lori Nasso and starring Baird, Finneas O'Connell, David Cowgill, Nasso, William Dennis Hunt, and Goh Nakamura. The film premiered in competition at the 2013 Heartland Film Festival on October 18, 2013. winning both the Crystal Heart Award for Narrative Feature and Best Premiere  It went on to screen at 20 more film festivals, winning 15 awards. The film had a limited theatrical release starting on October 17, 2014, and was released on DVD and VOD on April 21, 2015 by Monarch Home Video. In 2022, Life Inside Out was re-released by Vertical Entertainment across streaming platforms including Amazon, Apple+, Redbox, and Google Play.

Plot
A mother of three teenaged sons, Laura Shaw (Maggie Baird) rediscovers her old guitar hidden under the bed, which reignites her love of songwriting. She starts going to open mic nights, bringing her sensitive youngest son, Shane (Finneas O'Connell) along with her. Her first performance is a disaster. Shane, who has been sullen and cut off from his family and friends, shows an unexpected interest in her music and he encourages her to stick with it. She continues to go to open mic nights, bringing Shane and gets more confident as she plays. Slowly her confidence spills over into her personal life as well and her relationships with her family begin to shift. Moreover, soon Shane, too, begins playing guitar and writing songs of his own. With the help of new friends at the club and YouTube videos, he quickly develops his skills, surprising Laura and the entire family. Through music they develop a connection to each other not only brings them closer together, it brings them closer to the ones they love.

Cast
 Maggie Baird as Laura Cushman Shaw
 Finneas O'Connell as Shane Shaw
 David Cowgill as Mike Shaw
 Lori Nasso as Lydia Cushman
 William Dennis Hunt as Bill Cushman
 Goh Nakamura as "Uncle" Sam Kansaki
 Orson Ossman as Devon Shaw
 Roscoe Brandon as Eli Shaw
 Emma Bell as Keira
 Alexandra Wilson as Vicky
 Patrick O'Connell as Skip
 Emily Jordan as Lucy
 Kalilah Harris as Chloe 
 Joe Hart as Wayne

Featured musicians
 Xenia as Xenia
 Goh Nakamura as "Uncle" Sam Kansaki
 Yogi Lonich as Yogi
 Steve McMorran as Steve
 Cindy Shapiro as Cherelle
 Emma Bell as Keira
 Joe Hart as Wayne

Production
Much of "Life Inside Out" was inspired by Maggie Baird and Lori Nasso's real experiences performing at open-mic nights. Maggie Baird and Finneas O'Connell are real life mother and son. Baird and O'Connell wrote all of their own songs that appear in the movie. In addition, the filmmakers enlisted other singer-songwriters to play their music in the open mic night scenes and used the work of many others as source music. The bulk of the movie's budget was secured via a successful Kickstarter campaign in 2012, raising over $41,000 toward the production of the film.

Filming
The movie was shot in and around Los Angeles in 15 and a half days on the Red Epic by cinematographer Guido Frenzel. The club scenes were shot at Los Angeles' Club Fais Do-Do and the home scenes were shot at Baird's actual home.

Release
The film played at 20 film festivals including Heartland Film Festival, Cleveland International Film Festival, Phoenix Film Festival, San Luis Obispo International Film Festival, Palm Beach International Film Festival, and Port Townsend Film Festival, winning 15 awards including 4 best narrative feature awards and 4 audience awards. The film had a limited theatrical release starting on October 17, 2014, and was released on DVD and VOD on April 21, 2014 by Monarch Home Video. In 2022 Life Inside Out was rereleased by Vertical Entertainment across streaming platforms.

Soundtrack

Reception
On review aggregator Rotten Tomatoes, the film holds an approval rating of 67% based on 9 reviews, with an average rating of 6.67. On Metacritic, the film has a weighted average score of 57 out of 100, based on 4 critics, indicating "mixed or average reviews".

The non-profit family ratings association The Dove Foundation gave Life Inside Out its highest rating of 5 doves, saying, "this is a remarkable story with wonderful music." Common Sense Media wrote, "Parents need to know that love, respect, and acceptance within the family are the values that Life Inside Out holds close to its heart." giving it 3 stars. Gary Goldstein of Los Angeles Times said in his review, ""Life Inside Out" is a gentle, poignant drama whose heart and head are squarely in the right place. Engaging, naturalistic performances and nicely explored real-world issues add to this absorbing film's down-to-earth appeal." Katherine Vu of LA Weekly called it "A compelling tale." Sheri Linden of The Hollywood Reporter wrote, "The earnest film’s straightforwardness and down-to-earth characters — especially the lead performance by Maggie Baird — have a gentle appeal" but added, "its tendency to spell out every emotion and theme in on-the-nose dialogue undercuts its potential impact at nearly every turn." Ben Kenigsberg wrote in  The New York Times that “Life Inside Out” is so earnest that Hollywood overkill might have been welcome." Film Actually stated, "Baird and O'Connell are a joy to watch, as their acting styles complement each other like a perfect duet. Their actual musical duets are beautiful too, contributing to the film's winning soundtrack. With its pleasant music, sincere performances and heartwarming script, this lovely film is one of 2015's first highlights."

References

External links
 Official press kit at LifeInsideOutthemovie.com
 
 

2013 films
2013 drama films
2013 independent films
American drama films
American independent films
Films set in Los Angeles
Films shot in Los Angeles
2013 directorial debut films
2010s English-language films
2010s American films